Bartholomeusz is a middle name and surname related to Bartholomeus and Bartholomew. It originates from the Dutch word Bartholomeuszoon meaning the son of Bartholomeus, and may refer to
Egbert Bartholomeusz Kortenaer (1604–1665), Dutch admiral 
Mark Bartholomeusz (born 1977), Australian rugby union footballer 
Pieter Bartholomeusz Barbiers (1772–1837), Dutch painter
Ramani Bartholomeusz (1966–1987), Sri Lankan model and actress

Dutch-language surnames